Sholeh may refer to:

People
Muhammad Sholeh Ibrahim, Indonesian leader of Jamaah Ansharut Tauhid
Sholeh Maani, New Zealand academic
Sholeh Mahmoed Nasution, known as Ustadz Solmed, Indonesian preacher and actor
Sholeh Wolpé Iranian-American poet

Geography
 Sholeh-ye Zardu
 Sholeh-ye Zarik

Help
Arabic feminine given names